The Book of Swindles (Piàn jīng 騙經), also known by its longer title, A New Book for Foiling Swindlers, Based on Worldly Experience (Jiānghú lìlǎn dùpiàn xīnshū 江湖歷覽杜騙新書), is said to be the first published and printed Chinese short story collection about fraud. Written and compiled by Zhang Yingyu (張應俞), a man who lived in the early to mid 16th-century, it was published in Fujian province in or around 1617, and most of its stories are set during the latter part of the Ming dynasty.

To each story the author adds a commentary that in some cases offers a moral lesson and in some cases shows appreciation for the artistry of the swindler, often praising the cleverness of the con and blaming its victim.

Modern editions have been entitled both The Book Against Swindles (Fangpian jing) and The Book of Swindles (Pian jing). A selected English translation, The Book of Swindles: Selections from a Late Ming Collection, translated by Christopher Rea and Bruce Rusk, was published by Columbia University Press in 2017.

Background and themes 
The first edition of 1617 has the full title A New Book for Foiling Swindlers, Based on Worldly Experience (Jianghu lilan dupian xinshu), suggesting that it is a guide to avoiding swindles and to negotiating the risky world of the traveling merchant, a life that an increasing number of people were leading in the growing commercial economy of the late Ming. It can just as well, however, be read as a guide to carrying out such scams oneself.

Types of swindle 
The Book of Swindles is divided into twenty-four categories of swindle:

Author 
Zhang Yingyu, style name Kui Zhong (夔衷), is an obscure figure. The Book of Swindles is the only known work to appear under his name, and no other records of him are known. A note on the title page of one Ming dynasty copy claims that he was from Zhejiang province, while a 1617 preface says that he was from Fujian.

Relationship with other literary works and genres 
The Book of Swindles incorporates elements from a variety of other Chinese genres, especially court case (gong'an) fiction, in which a capable magistrate solves a crime. Stories involving sorcerers, Buddhist monks, and Daoist priests, who engage in alchemy or dream spirit possession, include motifs from supernatural tales. Other stories, featuring suspense, surprise and revelation, resemble jokes in structure. A minority include apocryphal anecdotes about historical figures.

Other works of fiction from the same time period, such as stories by Feng Menglong (1574–1645), Ling Mengchu (1580–1644), and Li Yu (1610–80), as well as novels such as The Water Margin (Shui hu zhuan) and Plum in the Golden Vase (Jin ping mei), feature accounts of similar scenarios of deception and trickery. Collections of swindle stories can also be found in contemporary China.

References

External links 
 Publisher website: The Book of Swindles: Selections from a Late Ming Collection at Columbia University Press
 Book excerpt: "Flashy Clothing Incites Larceny", Association for Asian Studies Asia Now# blog
 Book excerpt: "Pilfering Green Cloth by Pretending to Steal a Goose", Asian Review of Books
 Interview: "Trickster Tales and True Crime", Columbia University Press blog
 ChinaFile video interview with Christopher Rea and Bruce Rusk
 "Cons from the Late Ming Dynasty", China Econ Talk podcast

Chinese classic texts
Fraud in China
Chinese short story collections
Imperial examination in fiction
Ming dynasty literature